"Off the Wall" is a song by American singer Michael Jackson, from his fifth album of the same name (1979). It was written by English songwriter Rod Temperton and produced by Quincy Jones, and released by Epic Records as the album's third single on November 17, 1979 in the UK and on February 2, 1980 in the U.S. The song was first offered to Karen Carpenter, while she was working on her first solo album, but she turned it down. Lyrically, the song is about getting over troubles.

The song was well received by music critics, and became Jackson's third top 10 single from Off the Wall, which eventually spawned four top 10 singles; Jackson was the first person to accomplish this. It was performed by Jackson in five of his concert tours.

Reception
AllMusic's Stephen Thomas Erlewine highlighted the song on its studio album. 
The song became Jackson's third top 10 single from Off the Wall. It peaked at number ten on the Pop Singles Chart and at number five on the Billboard Soul Singles Chart.

Cash Box called it "another killer" after "Rock With You" and "Don't Stop 'Til You Get Enough," saying that "a fluid, sashaying dance beat rocks the cut."

Other versions

Live performances

Jackson performed the song on The Jacksons' Destiny Tour's (1979) second leg, as well as the Triumph Tour (1981) and the Victory Tour (1984). He performed the song only on the first leg of his Bad Tour (1987), his first solo tour. During the HIStory World Tour (1996), the song was included on the Off the Wall medley (also featuring the songs "Rock With You" and "Don't Stop 'Till You Get Enough") on some concert playlists. A live performance of the song can be seen in One Night in Japan, a bootleg live album and DVD release of Jackson's 1987 concert in Yokohama, Japan, during the Bad tour.

Sample
Mariah Carey interpolated "Off the Wall" on her song "I'm That Chick", which is included in her 2008 album E=MC².

Vaporwave producer Saint Pepsi sampled "Off The Wall" in the song "Enjoy Yourself," a line featured in the original song's chorus. The music video featured scenes from a McDonald's commercial with the character Mac Tonight.

PinkPantheress sampled "Off the Wall" in her 2021 single "Just a Waste".

Track listing

Official versions
Album Version – 4:05
Remix – 4:01
7" Remix – 3:47
Edit – 3:46  – Featured on the Essential Collection is an early fade of the album version.
Junior Vasquez Mix – 5:13  – Featured on the Stranger in Moscow single.
Live – 4:00  – Featured on The Jacksons Live!.

US and Japanese singles feature the remix running 3:47, while the UK and the rest of the world got the other remix running 4:01.

Personnel

Written and composed by Rod Temperton
Produced by Quincy Jones and Michael Jackson
 Recorded and Mixed by Bruce Swedien
Michael Jackson: Lead and background vocals
Louis Johnson: Bass
John Robinson: Drums
David Williams, Marlo Henderson: Guitars
Greg Phillinganes: Electric piano, synthesizer
Michael Boddicker: Synthesizer programming
George Duke: Synthesizer, synthesizer programming
Paulinho da Costa: Percussion
Horns arranged by Jerry Hey and performed by The Seawind Horns:
Jerry Hey: Trumpet, flugelhorn
Larry Williams: Tenor and alto saxophones, flute
Kim Hutchcroft: Baritone and tenor saxophones, flute
William Reichenbach: Trombone
Gary Grant: Trumpet
Rhythm and vocal arrangements by Rod Temperton

 Sound effects by George Duke

Charts

Weekly charts

Year-end charts

Certifications

References

External links
 

1979 songs
1979 singles
1980 singles
Michael Jackson songs
Songs written by Rod Temperton
Song recordings produced by Quincy Jones
Epic Records singles
Columbia Records singles
CBS Records singles
Songs about dancing